McKegney is a surname. Notable people with the surname include:

Ian McKegney (born 1947), Canadian ice hockey player
Tony McKegney (born 1958), Canadian ice hockey player

See also
McKenney (surname)